Baranow may refer to:

Baranow, Edmonton, a neighbourhood in Edmonton, Canada
Baranów Sandomierski, a town and castle in Subcarpathian Voivodeship (south-east Poland)
Baranów, Greater Poland Voivodeship, a village in west-central Poland
Baranów, Lublin Voivodeship, former town and shtetl
Baranów, Grodzisk Mazowiecki County in Masovian Voivodeship (east-central Poland)
Baranów, Lipsko County in Masovian Voivodeship (east-central Poland)
Baranów, Busko County in Świętokrzyskie Voivodeship (south-central Poland)
Baranów, Kazimierza County in Świętokrzyskie Voivodeship (south-central Poland)
Gmina Baranów (disambiguation), municipalities in Poland

See also
Baranov (disambiguation)